NVB may refer to: 

Najat Vallaud-Belkacem
Nederlandse Volksbeweging
National tariff system (Netherlands) (Nationale vervoerbewijzen)
Neurovascular bundle
North Valley Bancorp